Derek George Riordan (born 16 January 1983) is a Scottish former professional footballer who played as a striker. He was capped three times by the Scotland national team.

Riordan started his career with Hibernian in 2001 and had a brief spell on loan with Cowdenbeath in 2003. He became one of the top young players in the Scottish Premier League, winning the young player of the year awards in 2005. Riordan signed for Celtic in 2006, but failed to hold down a regular first-team place and returned to Hibernian in 2008. He totalled 104 goals in 260 appearances across all competitions in his two spells at Easter Road.

Riordan left Hibs as a free agent in 2011 and signed for Chinese Super League club Shaanxi Baorong Chanba, but the two-year contract was mutually terminated after just four months. He then signed for St Johnstone on a short term contract in March 2012. Riordan then signed for Bristol Rovers, but he was released after a three-month deal. He has since had short spells with Alloa Athletic, Brechin City, East Fife, York City, Edinburgh City and amateurs St Bernard's.

Club career

Hibernian 
Born in Edinburgh and raised in the city's Pilton area, Riordan signed for Hibernian on 14 May 1999 and made his first-team debut in 2001 in an Edinburgh derby. In January 2003, Riordan went on loan to Cowdenbeath, along with teammate Paul Hilland. He scored four goals in three appearances for the Fife club, including a hat-trick in a 7–5 win away to Brechin City. Cowdenbeath wanted to extend the loan to the end of the 2002–03 season, but he returned to Hibernian at the end of January.

Riordan was given an extended opportunity in the Hibs first team towards the end of the 2002–03 season. He became a first team regular the following season. Riordan was the club's top goalscorer for each of the next three seasons, with 18, 23 and 20 goals respectively. This earned him recognition in the form of the PFA Scotland Young Player of the Year and SFWA Young Player of the Year awards in 2005, and selections for the Scotland national team later that year.

At the end of the 2004–05 season, Riordan rejected an offer of an extension to his contract, and Hibs made him available for transfer. A £500,000 fee was agreed with Cardiff City in August 2005, but Riordan rejected the move. During the January 2006 transfer window, Rangers made a £400,000 bid for Riordan that was rejected by Hibs. Bids from Lokomotiv Moscow and Kaiserslautern were accepted by Hibs, but Riordan rejected these moves because he did not want to move overseas.

Riordan caused controversy in 2005 when he appeared in a video that showed him singing that Hearts player Rudi Skácel was a "fuckin' refugee", to the tune of The Beatles's "Yellow Submarine". Riordan later apologised for his actions.

Celtic 
Riordan signed for Celtic in a £170,000 deal in June 2006. The fee was reduced from the previous offers because Riordan's contract with Hibs was due to expire in October 2006, and Riordan had already made a pre-contract agreement to sign for Celtic on a free transfer in January 2007. Riordan made his full debut for Celtic in a Scottish League Cup tie against St Mirren, as Gordon Strachan fielded a team containing many players who were not first team regulars. He had difficulty obtaining a regular place in the Celtic team; he made only 24 league appearances in two seasons with the club.

Riordan publicly aired his disappointment at not being given more opportunities in the Celtic first team in April 2008, and he subsequently trained with the reserve team. Burnley made a £400,000 offer for Riordan in January 2008, but this was rejected by Celtic. Five other clubs, including his former club Hibernian, made loan offers for Riordan, but Celtic rejected these and informed Riordan that he would have to leave on a "permanent" deal. Hibernian made another loan offer to Celtic for Riordan in August 2008, but this was also rejected by Celtic.

Return to Hibernian 
Riordan returned to Hibernian on the final day of the 2008 summer transfer window for an "undisclosed" fee believed to be around £400,000. Hibs initially gave Riordan the unusual squad number 01, as number 10 had already been allocated to Colin Nish. Riordan was given the number 10 shirt for the 2009–10 season; he was able to do this as Nish had taken number 9 after Steven Fletcher left the club to join Burnley in the summer of 2009. Riordan made his second debut for Hibernian on 13 September 2008, when he came on as a 61st-minute substitute for Joe Keenan against Dundee United. In his second appearance, he scored the only goal of the match against Hamilton Academical. Riordan ended the 2008–09 season as Hibs' top goalscorer with 12 goals.

A good run of form at the start of the following season led to a recall to the Scotland squad and a player of the month award from the SPL. Riordan scored his 100th goal in senior football later that season; he brought up the milestone with a trademark free kick against Kilmarnock that gave Hibs a 1–0 win. Riordan had been omitted from Craig Levein's first Scotland squad, but Hibs manager John Hughes commented that Riordan had "worked very hard" in trying to win an international recall. His consistent goalscoring in the 2008–09 and 2009–10 seasons came about despite often playing in a wide midfield role.

Hughes again praised Riordan during the 2010 pre-season. Soon afterwards, Riordan declared that he wanted to agree a new contract with the club. He was however also linked with a £500,000 move to Azerbaijan Premier League club Gabala, who at the time where managed by Tony Adams. After the sale of Anthony Stokes to Celtic, Hughes started using Riordan as a central striker. Despite scoring three goals in the early part of the season, Riordan was omitted from the Scotland squad in October 2010.

After Hughes was replaced by Colin Calderwood as Hibs manager in October 2010, the new manager gave Riordan the team captaincy. In his second match as captain, the first Edinburgh derby of the season, Riordan was sent off for a reckless lunge on Rudi Skácel in the dying minutes of a 2–0 loss. Riordan bounced back by scoring both goals in a 2–1 win against Motherwell the following weekend. He registered his 100th goal for Hibs in all competitions during a 2–1 defeat at Kilmarnock in December. Riordan was the first player to achieve this milestone since Arthur Duncan thirty years ago. A goal against Hamilton in March 2011 meant that Riordan became the third highest goalscorer in the Scottish Premier League era, behind only the prolific Old Firm goalscorers Kris Boyd and Henrik Larsson.

In April 2011, the Daily Express reported that Riordan would leave Hibernian when his contract expired at the end of the 2010–11 season. The newspaper claimed that Riordan had turned down an offer of a new deal on reduced terms.

Shaanxi Baorong Chanba 
Riordan signed a two-year contract with Chinese Super League club Shaanxi Baorong Chanba in July 2011. On 10 July 2011, Riordan made his debut for Shaanxi Baorong Chanba as a substitute coming on for Fabio Firmani in the 76th minute as they lost 1–0 to Liaoning Whowin, and made his start in a 1–1 draw against Shenzhen Ruby on 14 July. His first goal came when he scored against Chengdu Blades in a 3–1 win on 21 August. He became a favourite player of the fans, but the team performed poorly in the 2011 season. The team manager, Gao Hongbo, criticised Riordan after a defeat by Dalian Shide. Riordan decided to leave the club and his contract was terminated by mutual consent in November 2011.

St Johnstone 
Sky Sports reported that clubs in Italy and Turkey were interested in signing Riordan in January. Riordan trained with Kilmarnock and Blackpool in January, and St Johnstone in March. On 30 March, Riordan signed for St Johnstone until the end of the 2011–12 season. On 21 April 2012, Riordan made his first start in a 2–0 defeat against Dundee United and played 90 minutes in a 5–1 loss against Motherwell on 28 April 2012. The Courier newspaper reported on 15 May that his contract with St Johnstone would not be extended.

Riordan agreed in July 2012 to go on trial with an unnamed club in La Liga. Later in July, Riordan trained with League One club Milton Keynes Dons. In August, Ross County made contact with his agent.

Bristol Rovers 
On 27 September 2012, Riordan signed for League Two club Bristol Rovers on a three-month deal. He made his debut on 29 September, in a 2–1 victory against local rivals Exeter City. He made his home debut on 3 October in a 1–0 defeat to Cheltenham Town. Riordan was released at the end of his contract, having made 12 appearances without scoring a goal.

Later career 

Riordan trained with Scottish Championship club Alloa Athletic in November 2013. On 14 February 2014, Alloa signed Riordan on a deal until the end of the season. He made only two substitute appearances in a spell that was affected by an ankle injury. Riordan was released by Alloa at the end of the 2013–14 season.

Riordan played as a trialist for Brechin City in October 2014. He was involved in three matches for Brechin, the maximum permitted for a trialist, after which Riordan turned down a contract offer.

He then played as a trialist for East Fife in February 2015, scoring the winning goal in a match against Annan Athletic. East Fife manager Gary Naysmith then offered Riordan a contract to the end of the season, which was signed in early March. Riordan left East Fife at the end of the 2014–15 season. He trained with Hibernian in September 2015, with manager Alan Stubbs commenting that Riordan had been provided with their facilities due to his previous service for the club.

On 29 January 2016, Riordan signed for League Two club York City on a contract until the end of the 2015–16 season. He was released by York when his contract expired.

Riordan signed a short-term contract with Scottish League Two club Edinburgh City on 27 February 2017. He scored on his debut on 11 March 2017, with a 75th-minute goal in a 2–1 away win over Forfar Athletic. Riordan left the club at the end the 2016–17 season following the end of his contract, having scored three goals in seven appearances.

He signed for Edinburgh amateur club St Bernard's in April 2018.

International career 
Riordan was capped five times by the Scotland national under-19 team (2001), five times by the under-21 team (2004 to 2005) and three times by the senior team (2005 to 2009).

Post-football career 
In January 2020, Riordan took over popular Easter Road bar The Four in Hand, renaming it 'R10rdan's Sports Bar' (styled after the Number 10 shirt number that he had worn at Hibernian).

Career statistics

Club

International

Honours 
Celtic
Scottish Premier League: 2006–07, 2007–08
Scottish Cup: 2006–07

Individual
SFWA Young Player of the Year: 2004–05
PFA Scotland Young Player of the Year: 2004–05
Scottish Premier League Player of the Month: September 2009
Scottish Premier League Young Player of the Month: April 2004, September 2004, November 2004, December 2004, January 2005, May 2005

References

External links 

Derek Riordan profile at the Scottish Football Association website

1983 births
Living people
Footballers from Edinburgh
Scottish footballers
Scotland youth international footballers
Scotland under-21 international footballers
Scotland international footballers
Association football forwards
Hibernian F.C. players
Cowdenbeath F.C. players
Celtic F.C. players
Beijing Renhe F.C. players
St Johnstone F.C. players
Bristol Rovers F.C. players
Alloa Athletic F.C. players
Brechin City F.C. players
East Fife F.C. players
York City F.C. players
F.C. Edinburgh players
Scottish Premier League players
Scottish Football League players
Chinese Super League players
English Football League players
Scottish Professional Football League players
Scottish expatriate footballers
Expatriate footballers in China
British expatriates in China